The 2017 Canada Summer Games, officially known as the XXVI Canada Games, were held in Winnipeg, Manitoba from July 28 to August 13, 2017.

Venues
Axworthy Health and Recplex - Winnipeg (basketball, wrestling)
Bell MTS Place - Winnipeg (Opening ceremonies)
Birds Hill Provincial Park - St. Clements (triathlon, cycling, open water swimming)
Bison Butte Mountain Bike Course - Winnipeg (cycling - mountain bike)
Canada Games Sport For Life Centre - Winnipeg (basketball, volleyball)
Duckworth Centre - Winnipeg (basketball)
Elmwood Giants Field - Winnipeg (baseball)
Gimli Yacht Club - Gimli (sailing)
Investors Group Athletic Centre - Winnipeg (volleyball)
Investors Group Field - Winnipeg (Closing ceremony)
John Blumberg Softball Complex - Headingley (softball)
Kenora Rowing Club - Kenora, Ontario (rowing)
Manitoba Canoe and Kayak Centre - Winnipeg (canoe/kayak)
Pan Am Pool - Winnipeg (swimming, diving)
Ralph Cantafio Soccer Complex - Winnipeg (soccer)
Red River Exhibition Park - Winnipeg (cycling)
Sargent Park Beach Volleyball Centre - Winnipeg (beach volleyball)
Shaw Park - Winnipeg (baseball)
Southwood Golf & Country Club - Winnipeg (golf)
The Forks - Winnipeg (festivities)
University of Manitoba Stadium - Winnipeg (athletics)
Whittier Park - Winnipeg (baseball)
Winnipeg Lawn Tennis Club - Winnipeg (tennis)

Sports

 
Baseball
Basketball
Beach volleyball
Canoe/Kayak
Cycling
Diving
Golf
Mountain biking
Open water swimming
Rowing
Sailing
Soccer
Softball

Tennis
Triathlon
Volleyball
Wrestling

Calendar
Source:

Participating teams
The number of athletes by province and territory are as follows:
 (344)
 (354)
 (330)
 (302)
 (273)
 (95)
 (318)
 (8)
 (353)
 (236)
 (334)
 (325)
 (116)

Medal table
The following is the final medal table for the 2017 Canada Summer Games.

Medal summary

References

External links
Official site 

 
2017
2017 in multi-sport events
Sports competitions in Winnipeg
2017 in Canadian sports
2017 in Manitoba
July 2017 sports events in Canada
August 2017 sports events in Canada
Youth sport in Canada
2010s in Winnipeg